Carlos Cassiano Bodini (born September 6, 1983 in Jaguariúna), known as Cassiano Bodini, is a Brazilian footballer who plays for Rio Claro as forward.

Career statistics

References

External links

Cassiano Bodini at ZeroZero

1983 births
Living people
Brazilian footballers
Association football forwards
Campeonato Brasileiro Série B players
Campeonato Brasileiro Série C players
Paulista Futebol Clube players
Esporte Clube Juventude players
A.C. Ancona players